Novohuivynske is an urban-type settlement in Zhytomyr Raion, Zhytomyr Oblast, Ukraine. Population:  In 2001, population was 5,267.

References

Urban-type settlements in Zhytomyr Raion
Zhytomyr Raion